Athletics was one of the seven sports of the 2011 Commonwealth Youth Games. Held between 9 and 11 September, the events were staged at the National Sports Centre in Douglas, Isle of Man.

A total of 34 athletics events were contested, 17 for both boys and girls. Racewalking and pole vault events were scheduled for both sexes, but did not take place due to lack of entries. Over the course of the three-day tournament 11 Commonwealth Youth Games records were set or improved. Strong tailwinds affected both the sprint events and horizontal jumps.

Each Commonwealth Games Association sent up to two athletes per event, including one relay team. The age of participating athletes was limited to 16- and 17-year-olds only. This meant that for 2011 athletes must have been born in 1994 or 1995 to be eligible to take part.

England was the most successful nation in the athletics programme, winning twelve events and taking 21 medals in total. South Africa won the next most gold medals, with six, while Australia had the next highest medal tally, with 17 medals overall. Kenya also performed well, with four golds among its ten medals. Host nation Isle of Man won one bronze medal. Twenty-six nations reached the athletics medal table.

The men's 800 metres was high calibre and medallists Timothy Kitum and Nijel Amos both went on to win medals at the 2012 London Olympics. Jazmin Sawyers, the long jump and relay gold medallist in Douglas, advanced into the senior ranks three years later at the 2014 Commonwealth Games by getting the long jump silver.

Medal summary

Boys

Girls

Medal table

References
Results
Commonwealth Youth Games 2011. World Junior Athletics History (archived). Retrieved on 2014-08-16.

External links

Commonwealth Youth Games
Athletics
2011
2011 Commonwealth Youth Games
Athletics in the Isle of Man
International sports competitions hosted by the Isle of Man